Nigerian Teens Choice Awards (also known as The NTC Awards or NTCA honours), first introduced, and launched in August 2012 by Nelson Ese Williams, for teen excellence and awards personalities who influence the teen world in Nigeria. The NTC Awards, consisting of music, entertainment, media, fashion, sport, art, social achievement, individual personalities in film, and social media in Nigeria.

History
The event is composed of 50 categories, and the 1st edition of the Nigerian Teens Choice Awards was held in 2012, and winners of the ceremony include Burna Boy, Korede Bello, Sina Rambo, Denrele Edun, Dammy Krane, and Wande Coal among others. At the 4th edition of the award, NTCA honours 52 Teens, including Tay Iwar, Efe Orake, and Speroach Beatz among others. At the 6th edition of the ceremony, Nelson Ese Williams introduced 6 new categories. On 24 July 2016, while speaking at a briefing in Abuja Nelson, said the 2016 edition is likely to have about 60 categories of nominations.

Ceremonies

Award categories
The following are the present categories:

Music categories

Choice Male Artist
Choice Female Artist
Choice Hip Hop Artist
Choice Afro Beat & Pop Artist
Choice New Song of the Year
Choice Upcoming Artist
Choice Producer
Choice Male Vocalist
Choice Female Vocalist
Choice Song Collaboration
Choice DJ
Choice Most Promising Act (Male)
Choice Most Promising Act (Female)

Media/Entertainment
Choice Media Personality
Choice Publicist
Choice Online Blogger/Blog
Choice Outstanding Male Photographer
Choice Outstanding Female Photographer
Choice Youtube Channel

Fashion/Style

Choice Fashion Stylist
Choice Fashion Designer
Choice Fashion Blogger
Choice Most Fashionable (Male)
Choice Most Fashionable (Female)
Choice Male Model
Choice Female Model
Choice Clothing Brand
Choice Make Up Artist
Choice Beauty Web-Star

Art/Theatre

Choice Most Artistic Personality
Choice Upcoming Actress
Choice Male Dance Act
Choice Female Dance Act
Choice Dance Group
Choice Most Talented Personality
Choice Comic/Humor Personality
Choice Compere/Host
Choice Poet/Novel Icon of the Year
Choice Visual and Graphic Designer
Choice Most Creative Personality

Sport
Choice Male Sport Personality
Choice Female Sport Personality

Personality
Choice Most Sociable Male Personality
Choice Most Sociable Female Personality
Choice Outstanding Male Personality
Choice Outstanding Female Personality

Social Achievement
Choice Male Entrepreneur of the Year
Choice Female Entrepreneur of the Year
Choice Most Influential Personality
Choice Philanthropist of the Year

References

Awards established in 2012
Nigerian music awards